New International Airport for Mexico City may refer to:

 Mexico City Santa Lucía Airport, current planned new airport
 Mexico City Texcoco Airport, the partially built new airport cancelled in 2018